Yevgeni Ivanovich Yatchenko (born 25 August 1986) is a Russian footballer.

Club career
He made his debut for the senior squad of FC Dynamo Moscow on 5 March 2006 in a Russian Cup game against PFC Krylia Sovetov Samara. He made his Russian Premier League debut for Dynamo on 9 April 2006 in a game against FC Amkar Perm.

Personal life
He is an identical twin brother of Dmitri Yatchenko.

References

1986 births
Footballers from Moscow
Twin sportspeople
Russian twins
Living people
Russian footballers
Association football defenders
FC Dynamo Moscow players
FC Ural Yekaterinburg players
FC Volgar Astrakhan players
FC Shinnik Yaroslavl players
FC Mordovia Saransk players
FC Novokuznetsk players
FC Olimp-Dolgoprudny players
FC Alashkert players
Russian Premier League players
Russian First League players
Russian Second League players
Armenian Premier League players
Russian expatriate footballers
Expatriate footballers in Armenia
Russian expatriate sportspeople in Armenia